John de Clinton, 5th Baron Clinton (died 1464) was an English peer.

Life
John was the eldest son of William de Clinton, 4th Lord Clinton and Alice de Botreaux. Succeeding his father in 1431, he exchanged Maxstoke for Whiston and Woodford in Northamptonshire with Humphrey Stafford, 6th Earl of Stafford, Acting as the garrison commander of Pontoise in France, he was captured during the siege and taking of the town and castle by the French in 1441.  In captivity  for more than six years until he ransomed for 6,000 marks. John relinquished his claim to the Barony of Saye in favour of Sir James Fiennes in 1448. 

John was attainted for his Yorkist sympathies in 1459, however he was restored to his titles in 1461.

Marriages and issue
He married firstly Joan, daughter of Edmund Ferrers of Chartley and Ellen Roche, they are known to have had the following issue: 
John Clinton, 6th Baron Clinton.

He married secondly Margaret, daughter of John St. Leger and Margaret Donet.

Citations

References

Barons Clinton
Year of birth unknown
1464 deaths
15th-century English nobility